99 Ways To Tell a Story: Exercises in Style is a 2005 experimental graphic novel by Matt Madden, published by the Penguin Group. Inspired by Raymond Queneau's book Exercises in Style, it tells the same simple story in 99 different ways. 
These ways include 
 Superhero,
 Bayeux Tapestry (as if a fragment newly discovered),
 Political cartoon,
 How To with an explanation of the process of drawing a page like itself
 parodies (similar to EC Comics' horror lines,)
 underground comix,
 manga, the fantasy genre); different, often unusual
 perspectives (from a voyeur looking in the window with binoculars,
 refrigerator, a fixed point in space in the downstairs room),
 a map,
 a lifetime,
 digitally — entirely in binary numbers,
 nested stories,
 advertisements
 Public Service Announcement
 Paranoid Religious Tract

American graphic novels
2005 American novels